The 1974 Delaware Fightin' Blue Hens football team represented the University of Delaware as an independent during the 1974 NCAA Division II football season. The Hens completed the 86th season of Delaware football. The Hens played their home games at Delaware Stadium in Newark, Delaware. The 1974 team was led by coach Tubby Raymond and finished the regular season with a 10–1 record to make the NCAA Division II playoffs. The Hens lost to Central Michigan, 54–14, in the Division II Championship Game, the Camellia Bowl.

Schedule

References

Delaware
Delaware Fightin' Blue Hens football seasons
Grantland Rice Bowl champion seasons
Delaware Fightin' Blue Hens football